Patrik Sabo (born 9 March 1993) is a Slovak football midfielder who plays for FC Andau.

Slovan Bratislava
He made his debut for ŠK Slovan Bratislava in home Europa League match against Videoton FC on 19 July 2012, the match ended 1 - 1 draw.

External links
ŠK Slovan Bratislava profile

UEFA profile

References

1993 births
Living people
Slovak footballers
Association football midfielders
ŠK Slovan Bratislava players
FC ViOn Zlaté Moravce players
Slovak Super Liga players
Footballers from Bratislava